One in a Million is a 1934 American drama film directed by Frank R. Strayer and starring Dorothy Wilson, Charles Starrett and Guinn 'Big Boy' Williams.

Cast
 Dorothy Wilson as Dorothy 'Babe' Brooks  
 Charles Starrett as Donald Cabot, Jr.  
 Guinn 'Big Boy' Williams as Spike McGafferty  
 Gwen Lee as Kitty Kennedy  
 Holmes Herbert as Donald Cabot, Sr.  
 Francis Sayles as Mr. Dickman 
 Fred Santley as Frankie, aka 'Madame Francois'  
 Barbara Rogers as Patsy Purcell  
 Robert Frazer as Detective Captain  
 Belle Daube as Aunt Helen  
 Lew Kelly as Store Detective Rourke 
 Jane Keckley as Mrs. Woods, Dickman's neighbor  
 Gladys Blake as Switchboard Operator  
 John Elliott as Store Manager  
 Leyland Hodgson as Aunt Helen's Butler  
 Eddie Fetherston as Eddie  
 Allen Wood as Bellhop  
 Albert Pollet as Desk Clerk  
 Hal Price as Witness Harry Miller

References

Bibliography
 Michael R. Pitts. Poverty Row Studios, 1929–1940: An Illustrated History of 55 Independent Film Companies, with a Filmography for Each. McFarland & Company, 2005.

External links
 

1934 drama films
1934 films
American drama films
Films directed by Frank R. Strayer
Chesterfield Pictures films
American black-and-white films
1930s English-language films
1930s American films